Megachile zapoteca is a species of bee in the family Megachilidae. It was described by Smith in 1853, and renamed by Cresson in 1878.

References

zapoteca
Insects described in 1853